Demetris Christofi (born 25 August 1994) is a Cypriot footballer who played for Olympiakos Nicosia as a midfielder. Christofi is a product of the AEP Paphos academy.

References

1994 births
Living people
Cypriot footballers
Olympiakos Nicosia players
AEP Paphos FC players
Association football midfielders
Association football fullbacks